Sybra violatoides is a species of beetle in the family Cerambycidae. It was described by Austrian entomologist Stephan von Breuning in 1975.

References

violatoides
Beetles described in 1975